Thomas Joseph Talbot  (14 February 1727 – 24 April 1795) was an English Roman Catholic bishop who served as the Vicar Apostolic of the Midland District from 1778 until his death in 1795.

Life
Thomas Talbot was born in Heythrop, Oxfordshire on 17 February 1727, the fifth son of the Honourable George Talbot and Mary FitzWilliam. Thomas' eldest brother, George, succeeded as the 14th Earl of Shrewsbury, and another brother, James, was the Vicar Apostolic of the London District.

He attended Twyford School, and then Douai in 1739. In 1745–46, together with his brother James, he made the grand tour under the tutelage of Alban Butler. He then returned to Douai to study theology.

On the expulsion of the Jesuits from France, Talbot was named President of the College of St. Omer's in August, 1762. In March 1776, he was consecrated to the titular See of Acon as coadjutor to Bishop Hornyold, whom he succeeded in the government of the Midland District in December, 1778.

Bishop Tlbot died in Bristol in 1795, and was buried in St. Joseph's Church.

References

1727 births
1795 deaths
Apostolic vicars of England and Wales
18th-century Roman Catholic bishops in England
Thomas
People educated at Twyford School